Stade Malherbe Caen is a French professional football club based in Caen in Normandy and founded in 1913. The club's first team play in the second tier of French football, Ligue 2. Much of Caen's history was as an amateur club but the club adopted professional status in 1985 after promotion to Division 2. The club reached the top division of French football for the first time in 1988 and has stayed between the top two divisions since. The club most recently spent five consecutive seasons in Ligue 1 before relegation in 2019.

Recent seasons

2014–15
2015–16
2016–17
2017–18
2018–19
2019–20
2020–21

Domestic results

Pld = Matches played
W = Matches won
D = Matches drawn
L = Matches lost
GF = Goals for
GA = Goals against
GD = Goal difference
Pts = Points
Pos = Final position

Ligue 1/Division 1 = Ligue 1/French Division 1
Ligue 2/Division 2 = Ligue 2/French Division 2

References

Seasons
 
Stade Malherbe Caen
Stade Malherbe Caen